Granatellus is a genus of bird previously placed in the family Parulidae, although biochemical evidence suggests it belongs in Cardinalidae, a move followed by the American Ornithologists' Union in 2009.

Species

References

 
Bird genera
Taxa named by Charles Lucien Bonaparte
Taxonomy articles created by Polbot